Hull Botanic Gardens railway station was an intermediate stop on the North Eastern Railway's Victoria Dock Branch Line in Hull, East Riding of Yorkshire, England.

History

It was opened on 1 June 1853, by the North Eastern Railway, and was originally known as Hull Cemetery. It closed to passengers in November 1854, before being reopened and renamed Hull Cemetery Gates in September 1866. It was renamed Hull Botanic Gardens on 1 November 1881, and remained thus until final closure on 19 October 1964.

Location
The station was at street level immediately to the north of a level crossing across Spring Bank, just east of the junction with Princes Avenue. The building was demolished in 1976.  The site is now occupied by a public house, Pearson's (formerly The Old Zoological) and car park.

The station was named after the former Hull Botanical Gardens, which were located opposite the station until their closure in 1889.  The gardens site is now the location of Hymers College.

References

External links

 Information about a model of the station being built by members of the Hull Miniature Railway Society

Disused railway stations in Kingston upon Hull
Railway stations in Great Britain opened in 1853
Railway stations in Great Britain closed in 1854
Railway stations in Great Britain opened in 1866
Railway stations in Great Britain closed in 1964
Former North Eastern Railway (UK) stations
Botanic Gardens (Hull)
Hull and Holderness Railway
Hull and Hornsea Railway